José Ángel Gómez Campaña (born 31 May 1993) is a Spanish professional footballer who plays for Levante UD as a midfielder.

Developed at Sevilla, for whom he appeared in 24 competitive matches, he went on to represent mainly Levante after signing in 2016. He also played for clubs in England, Germany and Portugal.

Campaña won two European Under-19 Championships with Spain. He made his senior debut in 2020.

Club career

Sevilla
Born in Seville, Andalusia, Campaña reached Sevilla FC's youth system at the age of seven, and made his senior debut at only 16, going on to play in two Segunda División B seasons with the reserves. He was promoted to the main squad by newly appointed coach Marcelino García Toral, for the 2011 pre-season.

Campaña made his debut for the first team on 25 August 2011, playing ten minutes in a 1–1 home draw against Hannover 96 in that season's UEFA Europa League (2–3 aggregate loss), in the place of Piotr Trochowski. He made his first La Liga appearance three days later, replacing Manu del Moral in a 2–1 home win over Málaga CF.

In his first year, Campaña appeared in 18 official games to help Sevilla to the ninth place. In March 2013, after undergoing surgery to a fracture in his left foot, he was sidelined for the rest of the campaign.

Crystal Palace

On 13 July 2013, Premier League club Crystal Palace had a €2 million bid accepted by Sevilla. Four days later, after passing his medical, he signed for four years. He made his debut on 24 August, in a 2–1 defeat at Stoke City.

On 31 January 2014, Campaña joined the Bundesliga's 1. FC Nürnberg, on loan for the remainder of the season with a view to a permanent move. He made his debut in the competition on 16 February, playing the entire second half in a 1–0 away victory over FC Augsburg.

Campaña scored his first goal for the German side on 23 March 2014, but in a 2–5 home loss against Eintracht Frankfurt. He finished the campaign with 591 minutes of action and five starts, with his team being relegated; he subsequently returned to Palace, being one of the retained players.

Sampdoria
On 22 July 2014, Campaña joined Serie A side U.C. Sampdoria for an undisclosed fee. However, on 1 September, he was loaned to Portuguese club FC Porto in a season-long deal, becoming the seventh Spaniard brought in by manager Julen Lopetegui in three months.

Campaña signed with AD Alcorcón on 17 July 2015, on loan for one year.

Levante
On 11 August 2016, Campaña agreed to a four-year deal with Levante UD, recently relegated to the second tier. He played regularly in his first season, as the club from Valencia won promotion as champions. 

In April 2019, when he had one year remaining on his contract, Campaña extended his link until 2023. He missed the vast majority of 2020–21, due to injury problems.

International career
Campaña represented Spain in two UEFA European Under-19 Championship tournaments. In the 2011 edition, hosted in Romania, he played three games, including the final against the Czech Republic.

In 2012, Campaña helped the national side renew their continental supremacy in Estonia by appearing in all five matches and starting in four, three as captain. He missed, however, his penalty shootout attempt in the semi-finals against France (4–2, 3–3 after 120 minutes). 

In October 2020, Campaña was first called up to the senior team for matches with Portugal, Switzerland and Germany. He won his first cap against the first opponent, playing the second half of a 0–0 friendly draw in Lisbon.

Career statistics

Club

Honours
Levante
Segunda División: 2016–17

Spain U17 
UEFA European Under-17 Championship runner-up: 2010

Spain U19
UEFA European Under-19 Championship: 2011, 2012

References

External links

1993 births
Living people
Spanish footballers
Footballers from Seville
Association football midfielders
La Liga players
Segunda División players
Segunda División B players
Sevilla Atlético players
Sevilla FC players
AD Alcorcón footballers
Levante UD footballers
Premier League players
Crystal Palace F.C. players
Bundesliga players
1. FC Nürnberg players
U.C. Sampdoria players
Primeira Liga players
Liga Portugal 2 players
FC Porto players
FC Porto B players
Spain youth international footballers
Spain under-21 international footballers
Spain international footballers
Spanish expatriate footballers
Expatriate footballers in England
Expatriate footballers in Germany
Expatriate footballers in Portugal
Spanish expatriate sportspeople in England
Spanish expatriate sportspeople in Germany
Spanish expatriate sportspeople in Portugal